Classic alternative is a radio format focusing on alternative music from the late 1970s to early 1990s, with particular focus on the early days of MTV.

Typical genres
 New wave: A major part of this category, especially early bands like The Cars, The Police, Blondie, Devo and Talking Heads.
 Power pop: Bands such as The Knack, The Smithereens and The Romantics are often included in this category.
 College rock: The major building block of American alternative rock, and thus artists in that genre are played often. The early works of R.E.M. (in particular), The Replacements and They Might Be Giants usually show up on classic alternative stations.
 Post-punk and British alternative/indie rock: Common on many classic alternative stations, and often added for variety. Artists include New Order, Public Image Limited and The Smiths.
 Gothic rock and dark wave: Bands such as The Cure, Joy Division, Siouxsie and the Banshees, Bauhaus and Killing Joke.
 Grunge: Sometimes played on classic alternative stations, but more often found on modern rock stations. Includes artists such as Nirvana, Soundgarden, Stone Temple Pilots and Pearl Jam.
 Synthpop: Bands such as Duran Duran, Depeche Mode and Pet Shop Boys and songs like "I Ran (So Far Away)" by A Flock of Seagulls and "Take On Me" by a-ha are essential on classic alternative stations.
 Dream pop and shoegaze: Bands such as Cocteau Twins, My Bloody Valentine, Slowdive, Ride, and The Jesus and Mary Chain. Uncommon, and depends on the amount of post-punk played on the station.
 New Romantic: Bands such as Spandau Ballet and Adam and the Ants.
 Ska revival: Bands such as Madness and The English Beat.
 Indie pop and modern indie rock: Artists including Aztec Camera, Sonic Youth and Orange Juice.
Punk: Bands including Ramones and The Clash.

Background
Some stations with an "all-'80s" format have added elements of the 1980s and '90s classic alternative format to their regular playlist. Cox's KHPT in Houston and WPOI in Tampa are prime examples of all-'80s stations that heavily relied on artists such as Peter Schilling, The Cranberries and New Order. KHPT flipped to a classic alternative format after its run as an all-'80s station. The same goes for KJAQ in Seattle, one of the first stations in the country to try this format.

Digital cable music service Music Choice (originally DMX) provided a station labelled New Wave for several years. The station was later renamed "Retro-Active", and later Classic Alternative, all of which played seventies to eighties new wave, post-punk, synthpop, etc. After several years, the station filtered in 1990s (and even sometimes post-millennium) artists. However, an artist like David Bowie can often fit in classic alternative because he meets the criteria.

SiriusXM offers a classic alternative station, 1st Wave, which was launched in 2008 following the merger between Sirius and XM and replaced similar stations on both services.

In September 2006, KLO-FM in Salt Lake City became "103-1 the Wave" with a classic alternative format.

In February 2022, XETRA-FM in San Diego relaunched as a mostly-classic alternative station, though still playing a few current songs. 

In August 2022, WOLT in Indianapolis changed its playlist to entirely classic alternative. 

In December 2022, WNNX in Atlanta resurrected the "99X" brand on 100.5 FM with an entirely classic alternative playlist.

References

Radio formats
1970s in music
1980s in music
1990s in music
2000s in music
2010s in music
Rock radio formats